Finland participated in the Eurovision Song Contest 2007 with the song "Leave Me Alone" written by Martti Vuorinen and Miikka Huttunen. The song was performed by Hanna Pakarinen. In addition to participating in the contest, the Finnish broadcaster Yleisradio (Yle) also hosted the Eurovision Song Contest after winning the competition in 2006 with the song "Hard Rock Hallelujah" performed by Lordi. Yle organised the national final Euroviisut 2007 in order to select the Finnish entry for the 2007 contest in Helsinki. 12 artists with two songs each were selected to compete in the national final, which consisted of four semi-finals and a final, taking place in January and February 2007. Twelve entries ultimately competed in the final on 17 February where votes from the public selected "Leave Me Alone" performed by Hanna Pakarinen as the winner.

As the host country, Finland qualified to compete directly in the final of the Eurovision Song Contest. Performing in position 5 during the final, Finland placed seventeenth out of the 24 participating countries with 53 points.

Background 

Prior to the 2007 contest, Finland had participated in the Eurovision Song Contest forty times since its first entry in 1961. Finland has won the contest once in 2006 with the song "Hard Rock Hallelujah" performed by Lordi.

The Finnish national broadcaster, Yleisradio (Yle), broadcasts the event within Finland and organises the selection process for the nation's entry. Finland's entries for the Eurovision Song Contest have been selected through national final competitions that have varied in format over the years. Since 1961, a selection show that was often titled Euroviisukarsinta highlighted that the purpose of the program was to select a song for Eurovision. On 11 August 2006, the broadcaster announced that the Finnish entry for the 2007 contest would be selected through the Euroviisut selection show.

Before Eurovision

Euroviisut 2007 
Euroviisut 2007 was the national final that selected Finland's entry for the Eurovision Song Contest 2007. The competition consisted of five shows that commenced with the first of four semi-finals on 20 January 2007 and concluded with a final on 17 February 2007. The three stages were hosted by Finnish presenters Jaana Pelkonen and Heikki Paasonen. All shows were broadcast on Yle TV2, via radio on Yle Radio Vega and online at yle.fi. The final was also broadcast via radio on Yle Radio Suomi.

Format 
The format of the competition consisted of five shows: four semi-finals and a final. Three artists each competed with two songs in each semi-final and the winning song per act qualified to complete the twelve-song lineup in the final. The results for the semi-finals and the final were determined exclusively by a public vote. Public voting included the options of telephone and SMS voting.

Competing entries 
Twelve artists were directly invited by Yle to compete in the national final following consultation with record companies and presented during a press conference on 8 November 2006. Among the competing artists was former Finnish Eurovision entrant Laura who represented Finland in 2002. The entries competing in each semi-final were presented in weekly preview programmes on Yle Radio Suomi between 15 January 2007 and 5 February 2007. On 6 January 2007, Jann Wilde and Rose Avenue had been disqualfied from the competition after their songs "Lover Lover Lover" and "Soft Is Selling" had already been publicly released before the semi-finals. The artists were later allowed by Yle to submit replacement songs by 10 February.

Shows

Semi-finals 
The four semi-final shows took place on 20 January, 27 January, 3 February and 10 February 2007. Each of the three competing artists' winning song in each semi-final qualified to the final based on the results from the public vote. A total of 51,535 votes were cast over the four shows. In addition to the competing entries, Arja Saijonmaa and 1966 Finnish Eurovision entrant Ann-Christine Nyström performed as the interval act in the first semi-final, while 1979 and 1993 Finnish Eurovision entrant Katri Helena performed in the second semi-final, and 1972 Finnish Eurovision entrant Päivi Paunu and Kim Floor performed in the third semi-final.

Final 
The final took place on 17 February 2007 at the Holiday Club Caribia in Turku where the twelve entries that qualified from the preceding four semi-finals competed. The winner was selected over two rounds of public televoting. In the first round, the top three from the twelve competing entries qualified to the second round, the superfinal. In the superfinal, "Leave Me Alone" performed by Hanna Pakarinen was selected as the winner. A total of 261,679 votes were cast during the show: 95,736 in the final and 165,943 in the superfinal. In addition to the performances of the competing entries, the interval act featured Danny performing his 1975 Finnish Eurovision national final entry "Seikkailija".

At Eurovision 

According to Eurovision rules, all nations with the exceptions of the host country, the "Big Four" (France, Germany, Spain and the United Kingdom) and the ten highest placed finishers in the 2006 contest are required to qualify from the semi-final in order to compete for the final; the top ten countries from the semi-final progress to the final. As the host country, Finland automatically qualified to compete in the final on 12 May 2007. In addition to their participation in the final, Finland is also required to broadcast and vote in the semi-final on 10 May 2007.

The semi-final and the final were televised in Finland on Yle TV2 with commentary in Finnish by Heikki Paasonen and Ellen Jokikunnas with the addition of Asko Murtomäki in the final. The three shows were also broadcast on Yle FST5 with commentary in Swedish by Thomas Lundin as well as via radio with Finnish commentary by Sanna Pirkkalainen and Jorma Hietamäki on Yle Radio Suomi. The Finnish spokesperson, who announced the Finnish votes during the final, was 2002 Finnish Eurovision entrant Laura Voutilainen.

Final 
Hanna Pakarinen took part in technical rehearsals on 7 and 8 May, followed by dress rehearsals on 11 and 12 May. During the running order draw for the semi-final and final on 12 March 2007, Finland was placed to perform in position 5 in the final, following the entry from Ireland and before the entry from Macedonia. The Finnish performance featured Hanna Pakarinen performing in a  black dress joined by a guitarist, bassist, keyboardist and drummer. The LED screens displayed three artificial flames and colours that transitioned between black, blue, white, red and orange. The performance also featured several effects including smoke, pyrotechnics and a wind machine. The four musicians that joined Hanna Pakarinen on stage were Jaakko Kääriäinen, Jyrki Alanen, Mikko Määttä and Risto Niinikoski. Finland placed seventeenth in the final, scoring 53 points.

Voting 
Below is a breakdown of points awarded to Finland and awarded by Finland in the semi-final and grand final of the contest. The nation awarded its 12 points to Iceland in the semi-final and to Serbia in the final of the contest.

Points awarded to Finland

Points awarded by Finland

References

External links
  Full national final on Yle Elävä Arkisto

2007
Countries in the Eurovision Song Contest 2007
Eurovision
Eurovision